Ensame Nacionalista Astur (ENA), was a political party in Asturias, Spain. ENA was an Asturian nationalist and socialist party.

History
ENA was created by ex-members of the Asturian Nationalist Council. The party presented a candidacy for the Asturian elections of 1983, led by the writer Andrés Solar. The list gained 2,505 votes (0.45%) and no seats. In the next Asturian elections the party presented a candidacy again, gaining 2,800 votes (0.49%). In the European elections of 1987 ENA, along with the Communist Movement of Asturias and the LCR supported the candidacy of the Basque coalition Herri Batasuna, that won 5,623 votes in Asturias (0.98%).

The party merged with the Xunta Nacionalista Asturiana to create a new party: Asturian Nationalist Unity.

References

 Patrick W. Zimmerman; Faer Asturies. La política llingüística y la construcción frustrada del nacionalismu asturianu (1974-1999). Editorial Trabe, 2012.

Defunct nationalist parties in Spain
Defunct socialist parties in Spain
Political parties in Asturias
Asturian nationalist parties
Left-wing nationalist parties